Anoplosceles is a monotypic moth genus in the family Geometridae. Its single species, Anoplosceles nigripunctata, is found in Java, Sumatra and Borneo. The species was first described by Warren in 1897.

References

Hemitheini
Geometridae genera
Monotypic moth genera